Samuel Mark LeComte  is an American professional racing driver. He last competed part-time in the NASCAR Camping World Truck Series driving the No. 47 Toyota Tundra for G2G Racing.

Racing career
LeComte mainly races in the Trans-Am Series TA2 class. Due to having experience at the Circuit of the Americas, when NASCAR made its debut there, CMI Motorsports brought in LeComte to make his NASCAR Camping World Truck Series· debut in the No. 72 truck. However, he posted the 40th fastest time in qualifying, which was not enough to make the race.

Motorsports career results

NASCAR
(key) (Bold – Pole position awarded by qualifying time. Italics – Pole position earned by points standings or practice time. * – Most laps led.)

Camping World Truck Series

 Season still in progress
 Ineligible for series points

References

External links
 

Living people
NASCAR drivers
Racing drivers from Texas
1960 births